George Gottlieb Jaensch (14 December 1872 – 7 November 1958) was an Overland Telegraph operator and post master in the Northern Territory of Australia from 1895 to 1910. Later in life he was a farmer and grazier in South Australia's Tailem Bend region. His father's name is Friedrick Wilhelm Jaensch (1846-1936) and mother's name is Augustine Fredericka Maria Gehrike (1847-1937)

References

 
 
  Mention in litertature: We of the Never Never -

Sources
 http://graememoad.com/Family/PS92/PS92_249.HTM [Lehmann Henschke - Person Sheet]

Settlers of Australia
1872 births
1958 deaths